Make It Count is second solo studio album by Danish hard rock singer and songwriter Ronnie Atkins. The album was released on 18 March 2022 by Frontiers Records. It is the follow-up to Atkins' debut album, One Shot (2021), which was also produced by Swedish guitarist Chris Laney.

Track listing

Personnel
Ronnie Atkins – lead vocals, backing vocals
Chris Laney – producer, arrangement, guitar, keyboards
Jacob Hansen – mixer, mastering
Allan Sørensen – drums
Pontus Egberg – bass
Morten Sandager – keyboards
Anders Ringman – acoustic guitar
Oliver Hartmann – guitar
John Berg – guitar
Lasse Wellander – guitar
Linnea Vikström – backing vocals

Charts

References

2022 debut albums
Frontiers Records albums